Daniela Davoli ( Annamaria Fiorillo; born  5 August 1957) is an Italian pop singer-songwriter, mainly successful in the second half of the 1970s.

Life and career 
Born in Pisa, after participating to several musical contests Davoli moved to Rome where she was put under contract by the label Aris. She made her record debut in 1974, with the double single "I ragazzi giù nel campo", a song with lyrics by Pier Paolo Pasolini and Dacia Maraini which was used for the Italian soundtrack of the film Sweet Movie.

She got her first hit in 1976, with the song "Due anni fa" which ranked seventh on the Italian hit parade. In 1977 she  entered the main competition at Sanremo Music Festival with the song  "Invece con te", and the single peaked at number 11 on the Italian hit parade. The same year Davoli participated at the  World Popular Song Festival in Tokyo with the song "Confessioni", not reaching the finals, and had another top ten hit with the single "Se fossi come lei". 

In 1979 Davoli debuted as a fotoromanzi actress for the magazines Lancio and Kiss. In 1980 she released her last single, "Incertezza d'amore"; the same year Davoli married, moving overseas and abandoning her music career.

Discography

Album   
   
     1976 - Fra tanto amore 
     1978 - Mia  
     1978 - Jour après jour (only released in Canada)

Singles   
     1974 - "I ragazzi giù nel campo"  (Aris, AN 402)
     1975 - "Mille volte donna"  (Aris, AN 407)
     1976 - "Due amanti fa" (Aris, AN 409)
     1976 - "Dimme perché" (Aris, AN 420)
     1976 - "Se fossi come lei" (Aris, AN 427)
     1977 - "E invece con te..." (Aris, AN 439)
     1977 - "Chissà cosa cerchi" (Aris, AN 442)
     1978 - "Diverso amore mio" (Aris, AN 447)
     1978 - "Mia" (Aris, AN 451)
     1980 - "Incertezza d'amore" (Discospray, AG 10151)

References

External links 

 
 Daniela Davoli at Discogs

People from Pisa
1964 births
Italian pop singers 
Italian women singers
Living people